Old Lindley or Over Lindley is a hamlet in the unparished area of Elland, in the Calderdale district, in the county of West Yorkshire, England. It is near the hamlet of Jagger Green, the village of Holywell Green and the town of Elland. Old Lindley has a moor called Old Lindley Moor.

History 
The name "Lindley" means 'Flax wood/clearing', the 'Old' to distinguish from Lindley. Old Lindley was recorded in the Domesday Book as Linlei/Linleie, Old Lindley was also known as "Linley(e)", "Lynley(e)", "Lynlay", Hold(e) "Lynlay", Old(e) "Lynlay", "Over Lynlay", "Linneley", "Lyndeley" and "Ouldlindley".

Governance 
Old Lindley was in the township of Stainland, in 1866 the civil parish of Stainland with Old Lindley was formed, on 1 April 1937 Stainland with Old Lindley parish was abolished and Old Lindley became part of Elland parish, which on 1 April 1974 became unparished. A parish council called "Stainland & District" now covers the area but as of January 2022 the Ordnance Survey doesn't show a civil parish by this name.

Landmarks 
There is a grade II listed house in Old Lindley that is now in 3 occupations. There was a pottery in Old Lindley.

References

External links 

 
 

Hamlets in West Yorkshire
Elland